National Arboretum may refer to
National Arboretum Canberra in Australia
National Memorial Arboretum at Alrewas, UK
Westonbirt Arboretum, formal name "Westonbirt, The National Arboretum", near Tetbury, Gloucestershire, UK
United States National Arboretum in Washington, D.C.
Type of an environment protected area with a national status in Ukraine (see Categories of protected areas of Ukraine)